The Yakovlev Yak-28 is a swept wing, turbojet-powered combat aircraft used by the Soviet Union. Produced initially as a tactical bomber, it was also manufactured in reconnaissance, electronic warfare, interceptor, and trainer versions, known by the NATO reporting names  Brewer, Brewer-E, Firebar, and Maestro respectively. Based on the Yak-129 prototype first flown on 5 March 1958, it began to enter service in 1960.

Design and development
The Yak-28 was first seen by the West at the Tushino air show in 1961. Western analysts initially believed it to be a fighter rather than an attack aircraft—and a continuation of the Yak-25M—and it was designated "Flashlight". After its actual role was realized, the Yak-28 bomber series was redesignated "Brewer".

The Yak-28 had a large mid-mounted wing, swept at 45 degrees. The tailplane set halfway up the vertical fin (with cutouts to allow rudder movement). Slats were fitted on the leading edges and slotted flaps were mounted on the trailing edges of the wings. The two Tumansky R-11 turbojet engines, initially with 57 kN (12,795 lbf) thrust each, were mounted in pods, similar to the previous Yak-25. The wing-mounted engines and bicycle-type main landing gear (supplemented by outrigger wheels in fairings near the wingtips) were widely spaced, allowing most of the fuselage to be used for fuel and equipment. It was primarily subsonic, although Mach 1 could be exceeded at high altitude.

Total production of all Yak-28s was 1,180.

Operational history
The aircraft is perhaps best known for the heroic actions of Captain Boris Kapustin and Lieutenant Yuri Yanov after the Yak-28 they were piloting suffered a catastrophic engine malfunction on 6 April 1966. They were ordered to divert to attempt a landing in Soviet zone of Germany, but lost control of the aircraft and strayed into the airspace of West Berlin. The crew managed to avoid a housing estate but crashed into Lake Stößensee without ejecting. Their bodies, along with the wreckage, were raised from the lake by Royal Navy divers (flown in from Portsmouth) and salvage specialists, who also retrieved important top secret material from the plane. This included the engines, which were taken to RAF Gatow to be inspected by RAF and American engineers. The bodies of the two pilots were returned to the USSR with full military honors from both Soviet and British armed service members, and they were both posthumously awarded the Order of the Red Banner. The first engine was recovered on 18 April 1966 and the second a week later; both engines were returned to the Soviets on 2 May 1966.

The Yak-28P was withdrawn in the early 1980s, but trainer and other versions remained in service until after the fall of the Soviet Union, flying until at least 1992. The reconnaissance and ECM aircraft were eventually replaced by variants of the Sukhoi Su-24.

Variants
Yak-129

Prototype of Yak-28.

Yak-28 (Izdeliye B)

Tactical bomber. Initial production version; built in small numbers without radar.

Yak-28B (Izdeliye 28B; NATO reporting name: "Brewer-A")
Production of Yak-28 with weapon-aiming radar fitted, and various improvements such as fittings for JATO bottles. Production number unknown.

Yak-28L (Izdeliye 28L; NATO reporting name: "Brewer-B")
Tactical bomber with ground-controlled targeting system using triangulation from ground-based transmitter sites. A total of 111 built.

Yak-28I (Izdeliye 28I; NATO reporting name: "Brewer-C")

Tactical bomber with the internal targeting system "Initsiativa-2" 360-degree ground-mapping radar. A total of 223 built.

Yak-28UVP prototype (ukorochennyy vzlyot i posahdka – short takeoff and landing)
A single Yak-28 converted for testing short takeoff and landing techniques with JATO bottles and braking parachutes.

Yak-28U (Izdeliye 28U) (uchebnyy – training) (NATO reporting name – "Maestro")
It was a dual control trainer with a second cockpit in the nose for student pilots; made as a prototype in 1962. A total of 183 were built.

Yak-28R (Izdeliye 28R; NATO reporting name: "Brewer-D")
A dedicated tactical reconnaissance version of the Yak-28I, with increased headroom under the pilot´s canopy, increased nose glazing with a sloping rear bulkhead, Initsiativa-2 radar, and five interchangeable pallets containing various mission equipment fittings. Prototype in 1963. A total of 183 built.

Yak-28SR prototype (samolyot raspylitel – spraying/dusting aircraft) first use of SR.
Chemical warfare aircraft for dispensing dust or liquid agents from underwing tank/applicators. Though recommended for production none were delivered to the VVS.

Yak-28SR (Izdeliye 28SR) second use of SR.
Tactical reconnaissance aircraft fitted with an active radio/radar jammer (either SPS-141 or SPS-143). Production was on a very small scale.

Yak-28TARK (televiszionnyy aviatsionnyy razveddyvatel'nyy kompleks)
Television reconnaissance system to send real-time images to a ground base. Backup provided by a 190 mm focal length still camera.

Yak-28RR (Izdeliye 28RR)
Radiation intelligence aircraft with RR8311-100 air sampling pods, for gathering samples of nuclear tests. The pods were specially designed for the Yak-28RR but became standard fit for all subsequent radiation intelligence gathering aircraft. Modification of a number of existing Yak-28R aircraft.

Yak-28RL
Radiation Intelligence aircraft conceived by fitting RR8311-100 air sampling pods, with no other specialist equipment. Modification of a number of existing Yak-28L aircraft.

Yak-28PP (Izeliye 28PP) (NATO reporting name – "Brewer-E")
Deployed in 1970, it is notable as the first Soviet electronic countermeasures (ECM) aircraft. It was unarmed, with an extensive electronic warfare (EW) suite in the bomb bay and various aerials and dielectric panels for transmitting the jamming signals. Excess heat generated by the jamming equipment was dissipated by heat exchangers under the centre fuselage; it did not include a radome. Produced in the 1970s in unknown numbers.

Yak-28VV proposition (vertikahl'nyy vzlyot – vertical take-off)
A vertical takeoff and landing project, with two R-27AF-300 lift/cruise engines and four R39P-300 lift engines in the forward fuselage.

Yak-28LSh proposition
Light attack aircraft project competing with the Ilyushin Il-102 and Sukhoi T-8, eliminated at an early stage.

Yak-28P (Izdeliye 40) (NATO reporting name – "Firebar")
A dedicated long-range interceptor version, the Yak-28P was developed from 1960 and deployed operationally from 1964. It omitted the internal weapons bay in favor of additional fuselage tanks (its fuel capacity was considerable, limited by weight rather than volume), and added a new 'Oriol-D' interception radar compatible with the R-98 (AA-3 'Anab') air-to-air missile. Late production "upgraded" Yak-28Ps had a longer radome of pure conical shape and enhanced armament. Produced until 1967, with 435 built.

Yak-28PM prototype

Upgraded Yak-28P with R11AF3-300 engines, flight testing started in 1963 but development abandoned when the R11AF3-300 did not enter production.The re-engined "PM" modification has established a speed record of 2,400 km/h in 1963.

Yak-28URP prototype

High altitude interceptor prototype using a rocket engine to boost performance during the interception phase.

Yak-28-64 prototype
Extensively redesigned Yak-28P with Tumansky R-11F2-300 engines moved to the rear fuselage with intakes extending to the cockpit, intended to compete with the Sukhoi Su-15. Performance was very disappointing, being slower than the Yak-28P, and serious aileron reversal issues caused the abandonment of the Yak-28-64.

Operators

Russian Air Force

Soviet Air Force
Soviet Anti-Air Defense

Military of Turkmenistan

Ukrainian Air Force operated 35 aircraft.

Specifications (Yak-28P)

See also

References
Notes

Bibliography

 
 Taylor, John W. R., ed. Jane's All The World's Aircraft 1976–77. London: Macdonald and Jane's, 1976. .

External links

 The Yakovlev Yak-25 & Yak-28 Air Vectors
 
 Aero-concept

1950s Soviet bomber aircraft
1960s Soviet fighter aircraft
1960s Soviet military reconnaissance aircraft
Yak-028
Twinjets
Aircraft first flown in 1958
High-wing aircraft